The Swiss Alpine Club is the largest mountaineering club in Switzerland. It was founded in 1863 in Olten and it is now composed of 111 sections with 160,000 members (2020). These include the Association of British Members of the Swiss Alpine Club.

History

The Swiss Alpine Club was the first Alpine club founded in continental Europe after the foundation of the Alpine Club (1857) in London. One of the founders and the first president of the Club was Dr. Melchior Ulrich; other members were Gottlieb Samuel Studer and Dr. Simler. The inaugural meeting was held in Olten. 

With the increasing number of climbers, steps had to be taken to make the approach to the mountains a little less complicated and exhausting. Until mountain huts were built, there had been no choice for the climbers other than sleeping in the highest chalets or in a Bivouac shelter under some overhanging rocks and, in both cases, firewood had to be carried up. The Swiss Alpine Club during the first twenty-five years of its existence contributed to build thirty-eight huts, of which the oldest was the Grünhorn hut on the Tödi (1863), followed by the Trift hut, near the Dammastock (1864). The Matterhorn hut was built in 1865, the Mountet in 1871, the Weisshorn Hut in 1876, the Concordia on the Aletsch glacier and the Boval hut in 1877.

Timeline
1863: Foundation of the club, after the Alpine Club (1857) and the Austrian Alpine Club (1862).
1863: Construction of the first mountain hut: the Grünhornhütte
1864: First publication a journal which will be named later, Die Alpen, Les Alpes
1900: The SAC is composed of 43 sections and 6000 members
1905: Opening of the Swiss Alpine Museum in Bern
1907: Women are not allowed in the club
1963: The club is constituted of 44'500 members (men only)
1977: Foundation of the central office in Bern
1980: Fusion with the Women Swiss Alpine Club (founded in 1918). The total effectives reach 75‘600 members.
1992: The first cultural prize of the SAC is attributed
1994: The SAC officially promotes competition climbing
1996: Abolition of the central committee
2006: The SAC receives the Milestone tourism prize

See also
Swiss Alps

References

External links

 Official website
 
 Association of British Members of the Swiss Alpine Club

Tourism in Switzerland
Mountaineering in the Alps
Climbing organizations
Hiking organizations
1863 establishments in Switzerland
Alpine clubs
Mountaineering in Switzerland
Swiss Alps